The Governor of Omsk Oblast is the head of government of Omsk Oblast, a federal subject of Russia.

The position was introduced in 1991 as Head of Administration of Omsk Oblast. The Governor is elected by direct popular vote for a term of five years.

List of officeholders

References 

Politics of Omsk Oblast
 
Omsk